Henry Pratt Lowe (February 1907 – October 1988) was a professional footballer. Born in Scotland, Lowe started his career at St Andrews United in Scottish junior football, before moving to England to play in the Football League for Watford and Queens Park Rangers. During the Second World War, Lowe played as a guest for several professional clubs, including Watford, QPR, and Chelsea.

References

1907 births
1988 deaths
Footballers from Fife
Association football forwards
Watford F.C. players
Queens Park Rangers F.C. players
English Football League players
Watford F.C. non-playing staff
English football managers
Aldershot F.C. wartime guest players
Brighton & Hove Albion F.C. wartime guest players
Chelsea F.C. wartime guest players
Millwall F.C. wartime guest players
Watford F.C. wartime guest players
St Andrews United F.C. players
English footballers
AFC Bournemouth managers
Yeovil Town F.C. managers